Second Thomas Shoal, also known as Ayungin Shoal (and Mandarin ), is a shoal or atoll in the Spratly Islands of the South China Sea,  west of Palawan, Philippines. Claimed by several nations, the shoal is currently militarily occupied by the Philippines.

History 
The shoal is one of three named after Thomas Gilbert, captain of the :

First Thomas Shoal –  (South of Second Thomas Shoal)
 Second Thomas Shoal –  (Southeast of Mischief Reef)
Third Thomas Shoal –  (Northeast of Flat Island - some distance N of Second Thomas Shoal)

Geographical location 
Located south-east of Mischief Reef, Second Thomas Shoal is near the centre of Dangerous Ground in the north-eastern part of the Spratly Islands; there are no settlements north or east of it. Drying patches are found east and west of the reef rim.

Geographical features
On 12 July 2016, the tribunal of the Permanent Court of Arbitration concluded that Second Thomas Shoal is, or in its natural condition was, exposed at low tide and submerged at high tide and, accordingly, has low-tide elevations that do not generate an entitlement to a territorial sea, exclusive economic zone or continental shelf.

Territorial claims 

Second Thomas Shoal is claimed by the Philippines and China.

The Philippines claims that the shoal is part of its continental shelf, while parts of the Spratly group of islands, where Second Thomas Shoal lies, are claimed by China, Brunei, the Philippines, Malaysia and Vietnam. In 2014, the Chinese government asked the Philippines to remove the grounded ship.

Philippine supply ships subsequently avoided Chinese blockades in order to deliver food, water and other supplies to the garrison. PRC coast guard vessels blocked two attempts by Philippine ships to resupply the garrison on March 9, 2014.  Supplies were airdropped to the garrison three days later.  A supply ship with replacement troops successfully reached the shoal on March 29, 2014 by sailing through shallow waters where the PRC vessels (with deeper drafts) were unable to follow.  During the approach, Philippine crew members and troops on the resupply ship waved the peace sign at the pursuing Chinese coast guard crew. Since then, the Philippine military has been sending monthly relief missions in the form of air dropped provisions to the troops stationed here.

In November 2021, Chinese Coast Guard vessels used water cannons and blocked two Philippine supply boats, preventing the boats from delivering essential supplies to the Philippine marine forces stationed on the BRP Sierra Madre.

Alternate names 
The Singapore National University Gazetteer (Number 75967), and the US NGA Gazetteer list the following as other names for the Second Thomas Shoal:
 Mandarin Chinese - Ren'ai Jiao
 Other Chinese names - Jen-ai An-sha, Jen-ai Chiao, Jên-ai Chiao, Ren'ai Ansha, 仁愛暗沙, 仁爱礁, 断节
 Vietnamese - Bãi Cỏ Mây 
 Filipino - Ayungin
 French - Banc Thomas Deuxième
 Other English names - Thomas Shoal Second
 Other names - Duanjie

References

External links

Maritime Transparency Initiative Island Tracker

Shoals of the Spratly Islands
Territorial disputes of China
Territorial disputes of the Republic of China
Territorial disputes of the Philippines
Disputed territories in Southeast Asia
Kalayaan, Palawan